Ernest Thomson  (born 1884) was an English footballer. His regular position was at full back. He played for Manchester United, Darwen, and Nelson.

External links
MUFCInfo.com profile

1884 births
English footballers
Manchester United F.C. players
Nelson F.C. players
Darwen F.C. players
Year of death missing
Association football fullbacks